Trace Creek is a stream in Madison County in the U.S. state of Missouri. It is a tributary of Twelvemile Creek.

Trace Creek was named for an Indian path near its course.

See also
List of rivers of Missouri

References

Rivers of Madison County, Missouri
Rivers of Missouri